The 2018 United States Senate election in Arizona took place on November 6, 2018, to elect a member of the United States Senate to represent the State of Arizona and replace incumbent Republican Senator Jeff Flake, who did not run for reelection to a second term. It was held concurrently with a gubernatorial election, other elections to the U.S. Senate, elections to the U.S. House of Representatives, as well as various other state and local elections.

The candidate filing deadline was May 30, 2018; primaries were held on August 28, 2018, three days after the death of Senator John McCain. Martha McSally won the Republican nomination, while Kyrsten Sinema won the Democratic nomination. Green Party candidate Angela Green was also on the ballot but had withdrawn and endorsed Sinema. The election thus featured an all-female ballot. Write-in candidates included Democrat Sheila Bilyeu, Libertarian Party candidate Barry Hess, Republican Robert Kay, Jonathan Ringham of The Old Republic, as well as others. On the night of the election, McSally held a narrow lead of about one percent. Approximately a million mail-in and early ballots however remained to be counted; Sinema took the lead the next day, in a blue shift. The Associated Press called the race for Sinema on November 12, 2018, and McSally conceded that day. With a margin of 2.34%, this election was the second-closest race of the 2018 U.S. Senate election cycle, behind only the Senate election in Florida.

Sinema became the first Democrat to win a U.S. Senate seat in Arizona since 1988, when former Democratic Senator Dennis DeConcini last ran for and won reelection to his third and final term in this seat. This was also the first time a Democrat won statewide in Arizona since 2006, when Janet Napolitano was reelected as Governor. McSally was subsequently appointed by Governor Doug Ducey to the other vacant Senate seat in Arizona, left open after McCain's death and then held on an interim basis by Jon Kyl. Two years later, McSally attempted to defend her seat in the 2020 special election and serve the remainder of the term, but lost to Democrat Mark Kelly.

Background
Arizona, located along the United States border with Mexico, has a unique political history. Upon its admission to the Union in 1912, the state was dominated by Democrats who had migrated there from the South, and aside from the landslide victories of Republicans Warren G. Harding, Calvin Coolidge, and Herbert Hoover, the state voted for Democrats until 1952, when Dwight Eisenhower carried it, and began a lengthy streak of Republican victories interrupted only by Bill Clinton's narrow victory in 1996. Since then, the state had remained in the Republican camp, and was won by Donald Trump with a 3.5% margin in 2016, although Trump's margin of victory was much smaller than that of past Republican presidential nominees. The last Democrat to win a Senate election in Arizona was Dennis DeConcini in 1988.

Incumbent Republican Senator Jeff Flake announced in October 2017 that he would retire at the end of his current term instead of seeking reelection for another term in 2018. Flake had previously indicated his intent to run for reelection in March 2017. However, he was considered vulnerable due to persistently low approval ratings, a poor relationship with President Trump, and the threat of a primary challenge from former State Senator Kelli Ward, who promised to run on a more pro-Trump platform. Additionally, he had won his first term in 2012 by only 3 percentage points, even though Republican presidential nominee Mitt Romney won Arizona by 9.

Republican primary

Candidates

On the ballot

 Joe Arpaio, former Maricopa County sheriff
 Martha McSally, U.S. representative
 Kelli Ward, former state senator and candidate for the U.S. Senate in 2016
 Nicholas N. Glenn (write-in candidate)
 William Gonzales (write-in candidate)

Failed to file 
 Craig Brittain, owner and co-founder of the revenge porn website IsAnybodyDown?
 Christian "C.J." Diegel, financial advisor
 Michelle Griffin
 Shawn Redd
 Nicholas Tutora, pharmacist

Withdrew
 Jeff Flake, incumbent U.S. senator

Declined
 Jan Brewer, former governor
 Paul Gosar, U.S. representative
 Jeff DeWit, treasurer of Arizona (nominated as NASA chief financial officer)
 Andy Biggs, U.S. representative
 Mark Brnovich, attorney general of Arizona
 Trent Franks, former U.S. representative
 Robert Graham, former chair of the Arizona Republican Party
 Christine Jones, former GoDaddy executive, candidate for governor in 2014 and candidate for AZ-05 in 2016
 Bill Montgomery, Maricopa County Attorney
 Ben Quayle, former U.S. representative
 Matt Salmon, former U.S. representative and nominee for governor in 2002
 David Schweikert, U.S. representative
 John Shadegg, former U.S. representative

Endorsements

Polling

with Jay Heiler

with Jeff Flake

Results

Democratic primary

Candidates

On the ballot

Deedra Abboud, attorney
 Kyrsten Sinema, U.S. representative

Failed to file
 Bob Bishop, pilot
 Matt Jette
 David Ruben, physician
 Chris Russell, attorney
 Richard Sherzan, retired administrative law judge, former Iowa state representative and candidate for the U.S. Senate in 2016

Withdrew
 Jim Moss, businessman, activist and former teacher

Declined
 Mark Kelly, astronaut, scientist, U.S. Navy captain and husband of former U.S. representative Gabby Giffords
 Randall Friese, state representative
 Ann Kirkpatrick, former U.S. representative and nominee for the U.S. Senate in 2016 (running for AZ-2)
 Greg Stanton, Mayor of Phoenix (running for AZ-9)

Endorsements

Polling

Results

Libertarian primary

Candidates

Declared 

 Adam Kokesh (write-in candidate), anti-war activist and U.S. presidential candidate in 2020

Removed
 Doug Marks, veteran and write-in candidate for IL-14 in 2010

Green primary

Candidates

Declared 

Angela Green (write-in candidate)

Removed
Eve Reyes-Aguirre, activist

Results

General election

Debates

Complete video of debate, October 15, 2018

Predictions

Endorsements

Fundraising

Polling

with Kelli Ward

with Joe Arpaio

with generic Republican and generic Democrat

with Jeff Flake

with Matt Salmon

Results
Due to the closeness of the vote count, the Associated Press and other major news outlets did not call the race until November 12, 2018, six days after the election.

Sinema defeated McSally largely by winning in heavily populated Maricopa County, home of Phoenix, which used to be a Republican stronghold but has since trended more Democratic in recent years. Sinema also won in heavily populated Pima County, home to Tucson, where she beat McSally with over 56% of the vote. Sinema also performed well in Coconino County, home of Flagstaff. McSally did well in many rural areas of the state. This was the first Senate election won by a Democrat in Arizona since 1988.

Counties that flipped from Republican to Democratic
 Maricopa (largest municipality: Phoenix)

Voter demographics

Aftermath
On December 18, 2018, Governor Doug Ducey appointed McSally to fill Arizona's other Senate seat, left vacant after the resignation of Jon Kyl, who himself was appointed after the August 25, 2018 death of John McCain. Initially, Kyl said that he would serve only until the new Congress was sworn in January 2019. Both Sinema and McSally were sworn in with the 116th United States Congress on January 3, 2019, marking the first time in history that Arizona was represented by two women in the United States Senate and making it the second state to be represented by two women from different parties. Sinema and McSally are only the second pair of senators from the same state in history to serve together after running against each other the prior year; a first such instance occurred in Oregon in 1996–1997. Ducey stipulated that Sinema would be sworn in first, making her the senior senator; this way, he said, the decision of Arizona's voters would be respected. Under Arizona law, McSally's appointment was only valid for the duration of the 116th Congress and a special election for her seat was held in November 2020 to determine who would finish what remains of McCain's term (which expires in 2023), in which McSally was defeated by Democrat Mark Kelly. McSally left office on December 2, 2020.

Notes

Partisan clients

References

External links
  (constantly updated)
 Candidates at Vote Smart 
 Candidates at Ballotpedia 
 Campaign finance at FEC 
 Campaign finance at OpenSecrets

Official campaign websites
 Kyrsten Sinema (D) for Senate
 Martha McSally (R) for Senate 
 Adam Kokesh (L) for Senate
 Angela Green (G) for Senate

2018
Arizona
Senate